Kosmos 1484 ( meaning Cosmos 1484), also known as Resurs-OE No.3-2  was a Soviet prototype Earth imaging satellite, launched in 1983 as part of the Resurs programme. It was a prototype of the Meteor-derived Resurs-O1 spacecraft, which paved the way for the first Resurs-O1 to fly in October 1985.

Kosmos 1484 was launched at 05:30:37 UTC on July 24, 1983. A Vostok-2M carrier rocket was used to place the satellite into low Earth orbit. The launch was conducted from Site 31/6 at the Baikonur Cosmodrome. Following the successful launch, the satellite was assigned its Kosmos designation, and was also given the International Designator 1983-075A, and the Satellite Catalog Number 14207.

Following the completion of its mission, Kosmos 1484 remained in orbit as space debris until its orbit decayed and it reentered Earth's atmosphere on January 28, 2013. The American Meteor Society reported that its re-entry fireball was witnessed over the eastern United States, with sightings from New York state to Georgia.

See also

 List of Kosmos satellites (1251–1500)

References

Spacecraft which reentered in 2013
Kosmos satellites
Spacecraft launched in 1983